The Full Ponty was a music festival first held in Pontypridd on the 27–28 May 2006. The name Full Ponty is a pun on Full Monty, and Ponty, the local nickname of the town. The festival is associated with The Pop Factory and is held at Ynysangharad Park, with additional "Fringe" events taking place at various venues throughout Pontypridd, including comedy, and up-and-coming bands. The event's organisers stated a lack of big-name acts as the reason for no Full Ponty 2008 but then promised that it would return in 2009, though no further festivals have been held since. The TV show that launched the event (The Pop Factory) is also no longer in existence, which was another factor in the demise of the event.

2006 Line-up 
Day one:

Feeder
Goldie Lookin' Chain
Delays
The Automatic
The Heights
The Poppies

Day two:
Funeral for a Friend
Biffy Clyro
Fightstar
Bring Me the Horizon
Panel
The Blackout
Days In December

2007 line-up 
The 2007 Full Ponty marked the second year of the event and took place on one day, rather than two on 26 May. The previous year saw all bands perform on a single stage over two days; the second year however saw more stages on a single day.

Main Stage
Lostprophets
The Automatic
Reel Big Fish
The Blackout
The Guns
The New 1920
Miss Conduct

Atrium Stage
Paramore
Kids In Glass Houses
Silverstein
Dopamine
The Ghost Of A Thousand
Eric Unseen

Coca-Cola Stage
Gallows
The Future
Viva Machine
Gethin Pearson And The Scenery
Along Came Man
Friends Electric
84MM

Fringe events
Head Automatica
Henry Rollins

External links 
 Full Ponty information from BBC Wales
 Independent Full Ponty forum at DragonNinja
 Discussions tagged 'The Full Ponty' at DragonNinja
 Full Ponty musicscoop.net

Music festivals in Wales
2006 in Wales
2007 in Wales
Recurring events established in 2006
2006 establishments in Wales